An election for President of Israel was held in the Knesset on 10 April 1973. Ephraim Katzir was elected to the position in a secret ballot. Katzir's first term began on the day of the election. It would be characterized by the Yom Kippur War that took place later in that year. He would hold this position until 1978, when Yitzhak Navon would be elected as the new president.

Results

References

President
Presidential elections in Israel
Israel